Sweetwater County School District #1 is a public school district based in Rock Springs, Wyoming, United States.

Geography
Sweetwater County School District #1 serves the northeastern portion of Sweetwater County, including the following communities:

Incorporated places
City of Rock Springs
Town of Superior
Town of Wamsutter though high school students attend Rawlins High School which is much closer.
Census-designated places (Note: All census-designated places are unincorporated.)
Arrowhead Springs
Clearview Acres
Eden
Farson
North Rock Springs
Point of Rocks
Purple Sage (most)
Reliance
Sweeney Ranch (partial)
Table Rock
Unincorporated places
Blairtown

Schools
Grades 9–12
Rock Springs High School
Independence High School (Alternative)
Grades 7–8
Rock Springs Junior High School
Grades 5–6
Pilot Butte Elementary School
Lincoln Elementary School
Grades K-4
Desert View Elementary School
Northpark Elementary School
Overland Elementary School
Sage Elementary School
Walnut Elementary School
Westridge Elementary School
Grades K-8
Desert School (Wamsutter, WY)
Middle School (7–8)
Elementary School (K-6)
Grades K-12
Farson-Eden School
High School (9–12)
Middle School (6–8)
Elementary School (K-5)

Student demographics
The following figures are as of October 1, 2008.

Total District Enrollment: 4,957
Student enrollment by gender
Male: 2,579 (52.03%)
Female: 2,378 (47.97%)
Student enrollment by ethnicity
White (not Hispanic): 3,867 (78.01%)
Hispanic: 898 (18.12%)
Black (not Hispanic): 84 (1.69%)
American Indian or Alaskan Native: 57 (1.15%)
Asian or Pacific Islander: 51 (1.03%)

See also
List of school districts in Wyoming

References

External links

Official Facebook page

Education in Sweetwater County, Wyoming
School districts in Wyoming
Government agencies with year of establishment missing